John Lindberg Trio may refer to:

JLT (John Lindberg Trio), a Swedish trio formed in 2006 by John Lindberg, with Martin Engström and Jocke Dunker
An American trio formed in the 1980s by John Lindberg, with Jimmy Lyons and Sunny Murray